John Ervic Manalo Vijandre (born January 26, 1986) is a Filipino professional basketball player, actor, model, and politician. As a basketball player, he plays for the Marikina Shoemasters of the Maharlika Pilipinas Basketball League (MPBL). Vijandre is also an active politician, serving as a councilor of San Juan, Metro Manila since 2022.

Filmography

Television

Film

Basketball career
Vijandre played for Wang's Basketball Couriers of the PBA D-League in 2012. His career high was 22 points. He was drafted by Rain or Shine Elasto Painters in 2013 in the second round as the 29th pick, but was later waived.

Vijandre played for the Congress-LGU Legislators and LGU Vanguards in the UNTV Cup as a celebrity guest player.

Vijandre played for the GenSan Warriors in the MPBL in 2018 as a celebrity basketball player.

Political career
Vijandre's first political venture was in 2013 when he ran for a seat in Taguig city council. He joined the local party Kilusang Diwa ng Taguig and included in then-mayoral candidate Rica Tiñga's ticket for the city's first district. However, he lost when he got the 10th place in the official count. (Taguig's city council is composed of 8 members per district)

In the 2022 elections, Vijandre decided to run again for a seat in the city council, this time, in San Juan. He joined PDP-Laban and included in Mayor Francis Zamora's Makabagong San Juan ticket. He managed to get the 5th place in the official count and proclaimed as councilor-elect for the city's 1st district.

References

External links
 www.realitytv.nfo.ph/ervic-vijandre-biography-profile-and-picture
 

1986 births
Filipino male models
Living people
Filipino men's basketball players
Kilusang Diwa ng Taguig politicians
PDP–Laban politicians
Male actors from Metro Manila
Basketball players from Metro Manila
De La Salle Green Archers basketball players
People from San Juan, Metro Manila
People from Taguig
Maharlika Pilipinas Basketball League players
Shooting guards
Rain or Shine Elasto Painters draft picks

Participants in Philippine reality television series
Survivor Philippines contestants
GMA Network personalities